is a passenger railway station located in the village of Geisei, Aki District, Kōchi Prefecture, Japan. It is operated by the third-sector Tosa Kuroshio Railway with the station number "GN32".

Lines
Local trains and rapid train which runs in the morning stop at the station from 2021.

Layout
The station consists of a side platform serving a single elevated track. There is no station building but a shelter with both an enclosed and an open section is provided on the platform for waiting passengers. Access to the platform is by a flight of steps. Parking lots for cars are provided near the station entrance.

Adjacent stations

Station mascot
Each station on the Asa Line features a cartoon mascot character designed by Takashi Yanase, a local cartoonist from Kōchi Prefecture. The mascot for Yasu Station is an angel with a round yellow face like the moon. She is named . This is because the nearby beach is popular as a sightseeing spot by moonlight.

History

Passenger statistics
In fiscal 2011, the station was used by an average of 39 passengers daily.

Surrounding area
The station is located in a residential area on the coast.

See also 
List of railway stations in Japan

References

External links

Railway stations in Kōchi Prefecture
Railway stations in Japan opened in 2002